Emperor Yes are a band from London. They have released three singles and an album. They have toured with Emmy the Great and Tim Wheeler, and Tall Ships.

For both the singles "Wasps", which has been used as the opening theme to the podcast No Such Thing as a Fish since the first episode, and "Cosmos" they have released videos and held exhibitions of art based on the songs. "Cosmos" was produced by Summer Camp's Jeremy Warmsley with a video directed by Chris Boyle, and has been played by Annie Mac on BBC Radio 1. "Wasps" is the theme tune to the weekly QI podcast No Such Thing As A Fish and its TV spin-off No Such Thing as the News.

In 2014 Emperor Yes released their debut album An Island Called Earth through Alcopop! Records.

Discography

Albums 
 An Island Called Earth (2014)

Singles 
 "Fishes" (2012)
 "Cosmos" (2013)
 "The End of the World" (2014)

References

External links
 Tape Club Records
 Video for Wasps
 Video for Cosmos

Musical groups from London
Alcopop! Records artists